Diano San Pietro is a comune (municipality) in the Province of Imperia in the Italian region Liguria, located about  southwest of Genoa and about  northeast of Imperia.

Diano San Pietro borders the following municipalities: Diano Arentino, Diano Castello, San Bartolomeo al Mare, Stellanello, and Villa Faraldi.

Diano San Pietro is the setting for the books by the English writer Annie Hawes, Extra Virgin and Ripe for the Picking.

See also 
 San Pietro (creek)

References

Cities and towns in Liguria